Dongjiaotou is a largely residential and former industrial area between Shekou and Houhai, Nanshan, Shenzhen, China.

See also
Dongjiaotou station, the Shenzhen Metro station serving the area.
Shenzhen Bay Control Point

References

Nanshan District, Shenzhen